Andrew Dick was an Australian cricketer who played for Victoria.

Dick made a single first-class appearance for the side, during the 1853–54 season, in just the fourth first-class match the team ever played. He scored three runs in the first innings and a single run in the second.

References

External links
Andrew Dick at Cricket Archive

Australian cricketers
Victoria cricketers
Melbourne Cricket Club cricketers
Year of death missing
Year of birth missing